Timothy John Groser (born 6 March 1950) is a New Zealand politician and diplomat. A member of the New Zealand National Party, Groser was a Member of Parliament between 2005 and 2015, and a cabinet minister between 2008 and 2015. He resigned from Parliament on 19 December 2015 to take up the role of New Zealand's ambassador to the United States of America.

Early years
He was born in Perth, Scotland and came to New Zealand with his parents in 1958. After completing his education at Victoria University of Wellington he served as a policy adviser in a number of key departments including Treasury, Ministry of Foreign Affairs and Trade, and the Prime Minister's Advisory Group under Robert Muldoon.

In the 1980s he was appointed New Zealand's chief agricultural negotiator in the GATT Uruguay round before being promoted to Chief Negotiator midway through negotiations. He subsequently became New Zealand's ambassador to Indonesia from 1994 to 1997.

Since then Groser has served as New Zealand's Ambassador to the World Trade Organization (WTO) and as the WTO's chairman of agricultural negotiations. He was heavily involved in the Doha round of discussions.

Member of Parliament

In 2005 Groser opted to leave the civil service and run for Parliament. He was selected to stand as a list-only candidate for the National Party in the 2005 election. He was placed 13th on the list and as a result was comfortably elected.

After the 2008 election he was given a Cabinet position with the Conservation and Trade portfolios.

Groser made international headlines in late 2012 when he said that the New Zealand Government would not sign up for the second commitment period of the Kyoto Protocol. Tim Groser said the 15-year-old agreement was outdated, and that New Zealand was "ahead of the curve" in looking for a replacement that would include developing nations.

In December 2012, the New Zealand Government announced that it was supporting Groser's bid to become the next Director-General of the World Trade Organization, a position which became vacant at the end of May 2013 with the retirement of Pascal Lamy. Groser's bid was eventually unsuccessful and the Brazilian diplomat Roberto Azevêdo was elected as the Director General of the WTO in May 2013. On 22 March 2015, Edward Snowden's The Intercept news website claimed that New Zealand's signals intelligence agency, the Government Communications Security Bureau, had spied on other WTO directorship contenders on behalf of Groser. Known targets included candidates from Brazil, Costa Rica, Ghana, Jordan, Indonesia, Kenya, Mexico, and South Korea.

Despite no official announcement having been made, New Zealand media reported earlier in 2015 that Groser was "widely expected" to replace Mike Moore as ambassador to the United States. This was confirmed by prime minister John Key on 7 December 2015, with Groser relinquishing his roles on 14 December. Groser will take up his post as ambassador in early 2016.

In July 2015, Groser said he believed reasonable people were being "whipped up into a frenzy" over issues like pharmaceutical costs and investor-state dispute settlement by people who, for ideological reasons, oppose the Trans-Pacific Partnership (TPP) trade agreement.

He resigned from Parliament on 19 December 2015 to take up the role of New Zealand's ambassador to the United States of America.

Personal life
Groser converted to Islam to marry Milda Emza, an Indonesian Muslim and his second wife, in 1996, during his tenure as ambassador to Indonesia. They are no longer married.

References

Portions of this article are based on public domain text from The National Party.

External links

Profile at National party

1950 births
Living people
New Zealand National Party MPs
New Zealand public servants
Scottish emigrants to New Zealand
People from Perth, Scotland
Victoria University of Wellington alumni
Permanent Representatives of New Zealand to the World Trade Organization
New Zealand list MPs
Ambassadors of New Zealand to Indonesia
Members of the New Zealand House of Representatives
21st-century New Zealand politicians
Ambassadors of New Zealand to the United States